A fan club is a group that is dedicated to a well-known person, group, idea or sometimes an inanimate object.

Fan club may also refer to:

 Fan Club (Alexia album), 1997
 Fan Club (Jellyfish album)
 Fan Club (TV series), a Quebec television series
 Fanclub (album), a 2006 album by Asian Kung-Fu Generation
 Fan Clubs, an episode of Hi Hi Puffy AmiYumi
 The Fan Club, a 1974 novel by Irving Wallace
 "Fan Club", a song by The Damned on their 1977 album Damned Damned Damned

See also
 Aishah and The Fan Club, a New Zealand band